The San Marino national football team represents San Marino in men's international association football competitions. The team is controlled by the San Marino Football Federation and represents the smallest population of any UEFA member.

The first official match played by a San Marino team was a 4–0 defeat in a European Championship qualifier to Switzerland in 1990. Previously, a San Marino side played an unofficial match against the Canadian U-23 team in 1986, losing 5–0. Since making their competitive debut, San Marino have competed in the qualifiers of every European Championship and World Cup, but have never won a match in either competition. They have only ever won once, defeating Liechtenstein 1–0 in a friendly match on 18 April 2004.

Until November 2014, San Marino were tied in last place in the FIFA World Rankings, a run that lasted since the rankings were given a new calculation methodology. They were tied for last with Bhutan (208th) in the October 2014 rankings, but a 0–0 draw with Estonia in the Euro 2016 qualifiers ended their tenure at the bottom of the rankings. San Marino scored their first away goal in fourteen years against another Baltic side, Lithuania, in the same qualifying phase. When the ranking methodology got revised again, the team fell back to the bottom following a 1–0 loss to Moldova in the Nations League.

San Marino's national team is sometimes considered the worst national side in the history of the sport, as they have only ever won once and concede an average of 4.2 goals per match, although as a member of UEFA, they face stronger competition than many other low-ranked sides.

History
Though the San Marino Football Federation was formed in 1931, the federation did not establish a national team until 1986, when a team representing the Federation played the Canadian U-23 team in an unofficial international, which ended in a 1–0 defeat. San Marino gained affiliation to FIFA and UEFA in 1988, allowing the team to participate in major championships. Prior to this, Sammarinese players had been considered Italian in international football contexts.

San Marino's first match in a FIFA-sanctioned competition was against Switzerland on 14 November 1990 in a qualifier for the 1992 European Championships. San Marino lost 4–0 and would go on to lose all eight of their other qualifiers. The team particularly struggled in away matches, losing all of them by at least four goals. San Marino scored only one goal, which was a penalty in a 3–1 defeat at home by Romania, and conceded 33 goals in total.

For their first World Cup qualifying campaign, San Marino were drawn in a group with England, the Netherlands, Norway, Poland and Turkey. The opening match resulted in a 10–0 defeat to Norway. The return match was less one-sided, finishing 2–0 to the Norwegians. A 4–1 defeat in Turkey saw San Marino score their first World Cup goal and a goalless draw against the same opposition on 10 March 1993 gave them their first-ever point. In their final qualifier against England, Davide Gualtieri scored the then-fastest goal in World Cup qualifying history after 8.3 seconds, though San Marino went on to lose 7–1. San Marino finished the campaign with one point and conceded 46 goals in 10 matches.

The team's qualification campaign for Euro 1996 followed a similar pattern to that of the previous European championships as they lost every match. A match away to Finland gave San Marino their first goal away from home in the European championship qualifiers, but the team lost 4–1. Their only other goal came in a 3–1 home defeat by the Faroe Islands; the two wins over San Marino were the only points gained by the Faroe Islands in the group. In the first match, a 3–0 score in Toftir, is the Faroe Islands record competitive win.

Even by Sammarinese standards, qualification for the 1998 World Cup was disappointing. Losing every match by three goals or more, San Marino failed to score a single goal. This is the only World Cup qualifying tournament in which they have failed to score. Qualification for Euro 2000 again resulted in defeats in every match. The closest San Marino got to gaining a point was against Cyprus, a 1–0 defeat on 18 November 1998.

In April 2001, San Marino gained their first ever away point, drawing 1–1 with Latvia in Riga. The team ended the 2002 World Cup qualifying group with a new best of three goals, though one of these came in a 10–1 defeat by Belgium. In Euro 2004 qualifying, San Marino lost all eight matches, failing to score. The closest result was a 1–0 home defeat by Latvia, with the winner scored in the last minute. Latvia went on to qualify for the final tournament.

In April 2004, San Marino gained their first win after more than 70 attempts, a 1–0 victory over Liechtenstein in a friendly on 28 April 2004 courtesy of a fifth-minute goal by Andy Selva. The match was Martin Andermatt's debut as Liechtenstein manager. Results during qualification for the 2006 World Cup followed a similar vein to previous qualifying groups. Matches were generally one-sided defeats, with the exception of single-goal defeats at home by Lithuania and Belgium.

San Marino's opening Euro 2008 qualifying match resulted in a record 13–0 defeat at home by Germany on 6 September 2006. They scored only twice and conceded fifty-seven goals in losing all twelve matches, although the home matches against Ireland, Cyprus and Wales were each lost by a single goal.

In the qualification campaign for the 2010 World Cup, they lost all ten matches played and failed to qualify. They conceded 47 goals in those fixtures, including 10 in a defeat by Poland, which became Poland's highest scoring victory of all time, and scored just once, in a 3–1 defeat by Slovakia. The Euro 2012 qualifiers started in a similar way, the first nine matches all being defeats with an aggregate of 49 goals conceded and none scored, their best result being a one-goal loss to Finland at home, with the worst being a heavy 11–0 loss to the Netherlands, which became the Netherlands' highest scoring victory of all time and San Marino's worst-ever away defeat. This was then followed up by two lighter defeats, a 5–0 home loss against Sweden, before completing the campaign with a 4–0 away loss to Moldova.

On 10 September 2013, Alessandro Della Valle scored San Marino's first competitive goal in five years. With the score 1–0 to Poland in the Stadio Olimpico, Della Valle headed in a free-kick in the 22nd minute, beating goalkeeper Artur Boruc at his front post. Poland then regained the lead a minute later and eventually won 5–1. It was the first international goal of any kind scored by San Marino since the national team lost 3–2 at home to Malta in 2012.

On 15 November 2014, San Marino drew 0–0 at home against Estonia. It was the first time in ten years that the team had not lost a match, ending a 61–match losing streak, and securing the country's first-ever point in a European Championship qualifier.

In October 2016, Mattia Stefanelli scored for San Marino in their 4–1 loss to Norway.

On 16 November 2019, Filippo Berardi scored a goal in a 3–1 loss to Kazakhstan in a Euro 2020 qualifying match—the first goal for San Marino in two years (5–1 vs. Azerbaijan on 4 September 2017) and their first home goal in six years (5–1 vs. Poland on 10 September 2013).

On 13 October 2020, San Marino recorded their fourth competitive draw and their first since 2014, after their Nations League match with Liechtenstein ended 0–0. A month later they made history by holding Gibraltar to a goalless draw, surviving with ten men after Davide Simoncini was sent off. This heralded several firsts for them: the first major tournament in which they had gained more than one point, the first time they had gained more than one point in a calendar year and the first time that they had gone unbeaten without conceding a single goal in two consecutive competitive matches.

On 7 December 2020, San Marino was drawn into Group I for the 2022 World Cup qualifiers. The team failed to get a single point and lost all their matches, including a 0–10 home defeat against England, and with a record of one goal scored, at home against Poland in a 1–7 loss, against 46 conceded.

On 28 March 2022, San Marino played the first official match in its history against a non-European team in a friendly match against Cape Verde played on neutral venue in Spain, the result being a 2–0 loss. San Marino then took on a second African side with a much lower standard than the previous one, the 198th ranked Seychelles, whom they hosted in a friendly at Stadio Olimpico on 21 September 2022. San Marino ended an 18-game losing streak with a goalless draw. The 2022–2023 edition of the UEFA Nations League saw the selection again in Group B of League D composed of three teams, but they lost their four games without scoring a goal. As a result, San Marino is the only European team that has not yet managed to score a goal in three participations.

Team image

Kit suppliers

Home stadium
San Marino play home matches at the San Marino Stadium, a municipally owned stadium in Serravalle which also hosts the matches of club side San Marino Calcio. It has a capacity of 7,000. Crowds are low but there is always a fan group called "Brigata Mai 1 Gioia", mainly composed of Italians from Emilia-Romagna. On occasion travelling supporters outnumber the Sammarinese support. For example, in the fixture against the Republic of Ireland in February 2007, 2,500 of the 3,294 crowd were Irish supporters.

San Marino have played three "home" matches outside their borders. For World Cup qualifiers against England and the Netherlands in 1993 the Stadio Renato Dall'Ara in Bologna was used and for UEFA Nations League match against Liechtenstein in 2020 at the Stadio Romeo Neri in Rimini.

Reputation
San Marino has the smallest population of any UEFA country. As of 2 June 2022, the republic has never won a competitive fixture. A 2004 1–0 friendly win against Liechtenstein remains their sole victory.

The national side is mainly composed of amateur players. Only a small number of players are at least semi-professionals, as many hold second jobs outside of the sport. Their 13–0 defeat at home by Germany is a European Championship record and they have conceded ten goals on four other separate occasions.

In the FIFA World Rankings, San Marino traditionally have the lowest rank of any UEFA country. Since the creation of FIFA rankings in 1992, San Marino's average position has been 176th.

In 2001, Latvia manager Gary Johnson resigned after failing to beat San Marino in a World Cup qualifier. The Republic of Ireland's 2–1 win over San Marino in February 2007 (from a last-second goal) resulted in scathing press criticism for the Irish team.

San Marino held the record for the fastest goal in FIFA World Cup qualifying history for 22 years when they stunned England with a goal after only 8.3 seconds in 1993. England went on to win the match 7–1. San Marino do however still hold the record as far as scoring against professional opponents is concerned, as Belgium's Christian Benteke scored against Gibraltar.

San Marino set a European record when they went over 20 matches without scoring between October 2008 and August 2012. On 8 September 2015, San Marino scored its first away goal in 14 years when Matteo Vitaioli scored against Lithuania in Euro 2016 qualification.

An interesting result of San Marino's weaknesses is that many people see them as football's biggest underdogs; as a result, they have gained a substantial following online from across the world. This is fairly evident on Twitter with many fan accounts dedicated to following the team.

Results and fixtures

Legend

2022

2023

Coaching staff
Current technical staff:

Manager history
Players

Current squad
The following players were selected up for the friendlies match against Saint Lucia on 17 and 20 November 2022.

Caps and goals correct as of 20 November after the second match against Saint Lucia.

Recent call-ups
The following players have been called up within the last 12 months and are still eligible to represent.

{{nat fs r player|no=|pos=FW|name=Filippo Berardi|age=|caps=21|goals=1|club=Unattached|clubnat=|latest=v. , 2 June 2022 PRE}}

INJ Withdrew due to injury
PRE Preliminary squad / standby
RET Retired from the national team
SUS Serving suspension
WD Player withdrew from the squad due to non-injury issue.

Records

Players in bold are still active with San Marino.

Most capped players

Top goalscorers

Competitive record

FIFA World Cup

UEFA European Championship

UEFA Nations League

Mediterranean Games

All-time record

Official matches

Unofficial matches

List of matches not lost by San Marino

See also
Sport in San Marino
Football in San Marino
San Marino Football Federation
San Marino national football B team
San Marino national under-21 football team
San Marino national under-19 football team
San Marino national under-17 football team
San Marino women's national football team

References

External links

Official website of the San Marino Football Federation
Official team page
National TV broadcasting football news
RSSSF Archive of international results 1986–present (list of results)
RSSSF Archive of international Goals and Caps
Reports of all official matches

 
European national association football teams
National sports teams established in 1990